Echinochloa esculenta is a species of grass in the family Poaceae. It is referred to by the common names Japanese barnyard millet or Japanese millet, is a species of Echinochloa that is cultivated on a small scale in India, Japan, China and Korea, both as a food and for animal fodder. It is grown in areas where the land is unsuitable or the climate too cool for paddy rice cultivation. However, the development of rice varieties that can withstand cold has led to a sharp decline in the cultivation of Japanese barnyard millet, in favor of rice. The earliest records of the domesticated form date to 2000 BC from the Jōmon period of Japan.

Japanese barnyard millet was domesticated from Echinochloa crus-galli. As is common for grain domestication, it underwent grain enlargement. That part of the process took one to two thousand years, occurring in Japan.

Etymology

Echinochloa is derived from Greek and means 'hedgehog-grass'.

Esculenta means ‘fit to eat’, ‘edible [by humans]’, or ‘full of food'.

See also
 Echinochloa frumentacea, also called Japanese millet

References

Millets
esculenta
Taxa named by Alexander Braun
Cereals